Beyblade is a 2001 Japanese anime television series based on Takao Aoki's manga series of the same name, which itself is based on the Beyblade spinning top game from Takara Tomy. The 52-episode series was produced by Madhouse under the direction of Mitsuo Hashimoto.

A third season, titled Beyblade G-Revolution,  was first broadcast on TV Tokyo in Japan from January 6 to December 29, 2003. The season was licensed for English adaptation, broadcast, and release by Nelvana. The series was broadcast on the sibling cable channel YTV in Canada and ABC Family in the United States in 2004.

The season uses five pieces of theme music: Two opening themes and three ending themes. From episodes 32–52, the second opening theme is "Identified by Springs while the ending theme is "Sign of Wish" by Makiyo. For episode 52, "Kaze no Fuku Basho" was also used as a special ending theme for the final episode of the series. For the English version, the opening and ending themes are "Let's Beyblade!" by Sick Kid ft. Lukas Rossi.



Episode list

Notes

References

Beyblade Season 3
2003 Japanese television seasons